X is the tenth studio album by American progressive rock band Spock's Beard. Similar to what Marillion did for Anoraknophobia, the album was funded by pre-orders of a limited edition of the album before the album was recorded. Those who ordered the album's "Ultra Package" had their names listed in the CD booklet and included as part of the track "Their Names Escape Me", which is exclusive to the limited edition. The album was released independently in May 2010. A retail and digital release with Mascot Records was released in August 2010. This album is the last studio album recorded with Nick D'Virgilio performing lead vocals, who left the band on November 18, 2011, to focus on other commitments. He rejoined the band in 2017 to play on the Noise Floor release, however his future in the band remains unknown.

Track listing

Notes
The above track listing is for the special edition. There are a few changes with the standard edition:

 "The Emperor's Clothes" and "Kamikaze" are swapped over in the track listing.
 "From the Darkness" has a slightly longer running time of 17:09.
 "Their Names Escape Me" is not included.

Critical reception
The X release continued the shift back to the classic Spock's Beard sound and is considered the strongest of the Nick D'Virgilio era releases. Sputnik Music said, "X is a winner on all fronts. It’s truly a triumph and a further validation of their post-Morse configuration. Spock’s Beard had rediscovered the spark that had made them so great before: every song is carefully elaborated and flows very well." Metal Reviews reported, "X is without a doubt the band’s best record with this line-up and can be easily added into the upper echelon of their works overall."

Personnel
Nick D'Virgilio – lead and backing vocals, drums, additional guitars
Alan Morse – guitars, backing vocals
Ryo Okumoto – keyboards
Dave Meros – bass guitar, backing vocals, additional keyboards

Additional personnel
Stan Ausmus - songwriting
John Boegehold – additional keyboards, guitar, vocals, songwriting
Jimmy Keegan – backing vocals

Production
Rich Mouser – recording, mixing, mastering

References

2010 albums
Spock's Beard albums